Nantyronen railway station is a railway station serving Nantyronen in Ceredigion in Mid-Wales. It is an intermediate station and request stop on the preserved Vale of Rheidol Railway. It is accessible by road from the village of Nantyronen, and also from the Devil's Bridge road (above), by descending the hillside on a steep winding lane.

Facilities
The station has operated throughout the history of the railway, except for a short closure during World War Two. The original station waiting shelter was demolished by British Rail. Later, a temporary building was located at the site. Following the provision of grant money from the European Union for rural community infrastructure investment, the station was considerably developed during 2013, and now has a raised-level and surfaced platform, fencing, and an attractive period (replica) station building. The car park area has been developed, and the site landscaped. There is also a water tower as all steam trains heading to Devil's Bridge stop to take on water.

Gallery

References

External links
 Picture of the last British Rail train to run on the VofR before privatisation, at Nantyronen.

Heritage railway stations in Ceredigion
Vale of Rheidol Railway stations
Railway stations in Great Britain opened in 1902
Railway stations in Great Britain closed in 1939
Railway stations in Great Britain opened in 1945